Birmingham City Football Club, an English professional football club based in the city of Birmingham, was founded in 1875. When league football began, the first teamthen playing under the name Small Heathcompeted in the Football Alliance before being elected to the newly formed Second Division of the Football League in 1892. At that point, club secretary Alf Jonesits first paid officialassumed some of what are now seen as managerial responsibilities.

There have been 40 full-time managers: the most recent appointee, John Eustace, was head coach from July 2022. Bob McRoberts was appointed in 1911 as Birmingham's first manager whose role did not include secretarial duties. George Liddell has had the longest tenure, of six years and two months (267 matches) in the 1930s, while Trevor Francis has managed the team for most matches: 290 over five years and five months between 1996 and 2001. All three formerly played for the club. Under Arthur Turner, Birmingham won the 1954–55 Second Division title, followed up with what remains the team's highest league finish, sixth place in the 1955–56 First Division, and reached the 1956 FA Cup Final. Gil Merrick in 1963 and Alex McLeish in 2011 oversaw League Cup wins and Barry Fry led his team to a "double" of third-tier title and Football League Trophy in 1994–95.

All managers who have taken charge of at least one competitive match are listed below. Each manager's entry includes his dates of tenure and the club's overall competitive record (in terms of matches won, drawn and lost), honours won and significant achievements while under his care. Caretaker managers are also included, where known, as well as those who have been in permanent charge.

History
In the early days, team management was undertaken by a club committee. When payment of players was legalised in 1885, Alf Jones began to act as club secretary on a voluntary basis. Small Heath's election to the newly formed Second Division of the Football League in 1892 prompted the board of directors to appoint him as the club's first paid official, responsible as secretary-manager for matters on the field in addition to his administrative duties. In his first season the club won the inaugural Second Division championship, and gained promotion to the First Division for the first time the following year via the Test Match system. Jones's 16-year tenure saw three promotions and three relegations, after the last of which in 1908 he resigned. The second of Alex Watson's three seasons in charge ended with the club having to apply for re-election to the league, and in 1911, responsibility for team affairs passed to former player Bob McRoberts, who became the club's first dedicated team manager.

Frank Richards succeeded Watson as club secretary in 1911, and when the First World War broke out he took over the managerial reins as well. Under Richards Birmingham won the Second Division title in 1921 and signed players such as Joe Bradford, Johnny Crosbie and Dan Tremelling who did much to keep the club in the top flight through the 1920s. He also forgot to enter them in the 1922 FA Cup. Billy Beer and Bill Harvey kept them in the First Division, albeit in the lower half of the table, before former Arsenal manager Leslie Knighton took charge in 1928. He led them to their first FA Cup final in 1931 and a top-half league finish the following year, but left when Chelsea made him an offer Birmingham were unable to match. Former Birmingham defender George Liddell kept them in the top tier until they were relegated in the last season completed before the Second World War, resigning in September 1939 when league football was suspended. His tenure of just over six years made him the club's longest-serving team manager.

Harry Storer, appointed just before the war ended, won the championship of the 1945–46 Football League South wartime league and the Second Division title two years later. Under Bob Brocklebank Birmingham were relegated from the First Division, but they reached the semifinal of the 1951 FA Cup and Brocklebank signed many of the players moulded by Arthur Turner into a successful team. Turner won promotion in 1955, the next season led the team to their highest league finish of sixth place and their second FA Cup final, and in 1957 reached the semifinals of both the FA Cup and the inaugural Inter-Cities Fairs Cup competition. In 1958 the club's experimental joint appointment, which gave new arrival Pat Beasley dual authority over playing matters while reducing Turner's responsibility for administrative matters, prompted Turner's resignation after seven months. Beasley himself quit when the club decided on a further restructure. He and successor Gil Merrick took the team to successive finals of the Fairs Cup in 1960 and 1961. Merrick managed them to their first major trophy, beating local rivals Aston Villa 3–1 on aggregate in the 1963 League Cup Final, but after four years of fighting relegation, the board asked for his resignation.

Joe Mallett presided over relegation before acting as assistant to Stan Cullis, who laid the foundations for the team's future success before retiring from football in 1970. Chosen only after abortive approaches were made to Don Revie, Brian Clough and Ronnie Allen, Freddie Goodwin converted the attractive but inconsistent football of Cullis's teams to a skilful, aggressive game capable of winning promotion and maintaining top-flight status. The British-record sale of goalscorer Bob Latchford to Everton was partially mitigated by the arrival of Howard Kendall and emergence of Trevor Francis, but the team struggled. Goodwin survived a vote of confidence in April 1975, but was sacked in September after his reaction to a training-ground incident provoked Kenny Burns into a transfer request. First-team coach Willie Bell, initially appointed as acting manager, achieved little in two years, and was replaced by club director Sir Alf Ramsey, whose brief managerial tenure ended with him leaving the club entirely. Jim Smith brought experienced players to the club but was sacked to make way for Ron Saunders, who had just walked out on league champions and local rivals Aston Villa.

Financial difficulties and instability at board level led to six managerial changes in seven years. Saunders resigned after FA Cup defeat to non-league Altrincham, John Bond seemed out of touch, and in April 1989, once relegation to the Third Division for the first time in the club's history was confirmed, the club's new owners replaced Garry Pendrey with Dave Mackay. Within 18 months, with relegation to the Fourth Division a possibility, Mackay resigned. Lou Macari came in, revitalised the side, won the Football League Trophy at Wembley, and three weeks later walked out to join Stoke City. Terry Cooper won promotion back to the second tier and kept the team going during four months of administration before he quit, fearing new owner David Sullivan would want to bring in his own man.

Southend United manager Barry Fry, hired at the cost of a record fine for "poaching", failed to avoid relegation but combined the Division Two title with another victorious trip to Wembley in the Football League Trophy in 1995. After one ineffectual season in the second tier which brought his total of players used up to 61, he was sacked. Trevor Francis introduced Premier League players to the team and took them to the 2001 League Cup final, but three successive play-off semifinal defeats led to his departure by mutual consent. Two months later, after the dispute over his release from previous employers Crystal Palace reached the High Court, Steve Bruce took charge. Bruce, the ninth former player to have served as permanent manager, led the club to promotion via the play-offs in his first season; his tenure of nearly six years made him the club's longest-serving post-war manager. After uncertainty surrounding a takeover bid for the club led him to accept the managerial post at Wigan Athletic, former Scotland manager Alex McLeish was appointed in November 2007.

Unable to avoid relegation at the end of his first part-season, McLeish led the team back to the Premier League at the first attempt in 2009, then guided them to a 12-game unbeaten run, a club record in the top division, and a ninth-place finish, their best since 1959. In 2010–11, his Birmingham team beat Arsenal in the League Cup Final to win their first major trophy in 48 years, but he could not keep them in the top flight, and resigned to take over at Aston Villa. Chris Hughton's team narrowly failed to qualify for the Europa League knockout phase and reached the play-off semi-finals, but with the club in financial turmoil and under a transfer embargo, he left for Premier League Norwich City. Lee Clark led Birmingham to a mid-table finish in his first season, but escaped relegation to the third tier on goal difference via Paul Caddis's stoppage-time equaliser at Bolton Wanderers in the last match of 2013–14. Continuing poor form, with only one home league win in more than a year, brought Clark's dismissal in October 2014. Burton Albion manager and former Birmingham City player Gary Rowett achieved two tenth-place finishes beforewith the team just outside the play-off positions, and to widespread surprisethe club's new owners sacked him and his staff and within hours appointed former Italian international player Gianfranco Zola, thus beginning a cycle of apparently ill-thought-out managerial changes.

After four months and 24 matches, during which the team won just twice and dropped to 20th place, three points outside the relegation zone with three matches remaining, Zola resigned. Harry Redknapp kept the team in the Championship, and signed a 12-month contract, but six consecutive losses in the first eight games of 2017–18 season brought about his dismissal. His former assistant Steve Cotterill's six straight defeats came five months later. Garry Monk kept the team out of the relegation places, repeated the feat in 2018–19 despite transfer restrictions and a nine-point deduction for failure to comply with the league's spending rules, and was popular with the fans, but he was sacked after disputes with the ownership over transfer strategy and style of play. His assistant, Pep Clotet, spent five months as caretaker head coach before being appointed on a permanent basis. Before football resumed after the COVID-19-related hiatus, the club announced that he would leave at the end of the season; the team's form plummeted, Clotet left early, they narrowly avoided relegation, and the BBC's West Midlands correspondent opined that the next appointment was "a decision [the board] cannot afford to get wrong if they are to steer clear of further turmoil and confusion." Aitor Karanka lasted six months of a 2020–21 season played behind closed doors before stepping down in favour of Lee Bowyer, who resigned as manager of Charlton Athletic to convert a Birmingham team "hopelessly out of form" into one that went six games unbeaten to secure safety with two matches remaining. At the end of yet another relegation-threatened season and amid rumours of an imminent takeover, Bowyer was replaced by John Eustace.

Managers  
All first-team matches in national or international competition are counted, except for those in The Combination of 1888–89, the abandoned 1939–40 Football League season and those in wartime leagues and cups. Dates and statistics thereafter are sourced from the English National Football Archive. Discrepancies are noted and sourced within the table.

 Names of caretaker managers are supplied where known, and periods of caretaker-management are highlighted in italics and marked .
 Permanent managers who previously played for the club are marked P.
 Secretary-managers are marked S.
 Managers whose tenure includes only wartime matches are marked W.

Win percentage is rounded to one decimal place.

Statistics are complete up to and including the match played on 18 March 2023.

Key

M: Matches played
W: Matches won
D: Matches drawn
L: Matches lost

Notes

Sources

References

External links 
 
 The Birmingham City FC Archive (via archive.org)
 Birmingham City managerial history at Soccerbase

 
Birmingham City F.C.
Managers